Mimexocentroides nitidus is a species of beetle in the family Cerambycidae, and the only species in the genus Mimexocentroides. It was described by Breuning in 1961.

References

Acanthocinini
Beetles described in 1961
Monotypic beetle genera